Omoglymmius astraea is a species of beetle in the subfamily Rhysodinae. It was described by R.T. Bell & J.R. Bell in 1988. It is known from Mount Muajat ( asl) in North Sulawesi (Indonesia).

Omoglymmius astraea measure  in length.

Notes

References

astraea
Beetles of Indonesia
Endemic fauna of Indonesia
Fauna of Sulawesi
Beetles described in 1988